Otoyol 21, abbreviated as O-21, a.k.a. Ankara-Tarsus Otoyolu, is a completed toll motorway in the Central Anatolia and Mediterranean regions in Turkey. Currently, it is  connecting Otoyol 20 from Gölbaşı, Ankara with the Adana-Mersin Motorway O-51 at Tarsus in Mersin Province. On its full length, it is part of the European E90. The last part of the highway opened on 16 December 2020.

Exit list

See also
 List of highways in Turkey

References

External links

Exit list of O-21
Mersin road map

21
Transport in Niğde Province
Transport in Adana Province
Transport in Mersin Province
Toll roads in Turkey